Suzhou Oriental Semiconductor Co., Ltd, abbreviated as Oriental Semiconductor, was founded in 2008, located in SIP, Suzhou, China. It invented the world's first semi-floating gate transistor (SFGT) with Fudan University in Shanghai. The related research paper was published on Science on August 9, 2013.

See also
FJG RAM

References

External links

Companies based in Suzhou
Suzhou Industrial Park
Semiconductor companies of China
Chinese brands